Andreas Fronius (born c. 1500 Siebenbürgen) was Stadtrichter (English: city magistrate) for Kronstadt, Siebenbürgen, and the father of Matthias Fronius.

See also
Fronius

References 

Transylvanian Saxon people

1500 births
Year of birth uncertain

Year of death unknown